Shen Wei is a Chinese artist known for his intimate portraits of others and himself, as well as his poetic photographs of landscape and still-life.  His artistic style has often been described as dream-like, elusive, and erotic.

Born in Shanghai, China, Shen Wei lives in New York City.

Recognition 
Hailed as "one of the most prominent Chinese photo artists of his generation" by CNN.  Shen Wei's work has been exhibited and published worldwide, with works included in the permanent collections of the Museum of Modern Art (MoMA), the J. Paul Getty Museum, and Philadelphia Museum of Art, among others.  He has received fellowships from New York Foundation for the Arts and Asian Cultural Council and had participated in prestigious artist-in-residence programs such as the Rockefeller Foundation Bellagio Center in Bellagio, Italy, and Light Work in Syracuse, NY.  His work has been featured in The New York Times, The Guardian, The New Yorker, CNN, Aperture, ARTnews, Paris Review, Financial Times, Le Figaro, American Photo, and so on.

Education 
Shen Wei received a Bachelor of Fine Arts degree from Minneapolis College of Art and Design (MCAD) and a Masters of Fine Arts degree in photography, video, and related media from the School of Visual Arts in New York City.

Collections
Shen's work is held in the following public collections:
 Museum of Modern Art, New York, NY
 Museum of Contemporary Photography, Chicago, IL
 The J. Paul Getty Museum, Los Angeles, CA
 Philadelphia Museum of Art, Philadelphia, PA
 Carnegie Museum of Art, Pittsburgh, PA
 Library of Congress, Washington, D.C.
 Ringling Museum of Art, Sarasota, FL
 North Carolina Museum of Art, Raleigh, NC
 Harn Museum of Art, Gainesville, FL
 John and Geraldine Lilley Museum of Art, Reno, NV
 CAFA Art Museum, Beijing, China
 LSU Museum of Art, Rouge, LA

Notable Exhibitions

Solo exhibitions
 Flowers Gallery, Shen Wei, London, NY (2019)
 Xie Zilong Photography Museum, Shen Wei: Blossoms, Changsha, China (2018)
 ON/Gallery, Undefined Time of Intuition, Beijing, China (2018)
 Signum Foundation, Between Blossoms, Lodz, Poland (2017)
 Flowers Gallery, Between Blossoms, New York, NY (2017)
 SinArts Gallery, Between Blossoms, The Hague, Netherlands (2017)
 Flowers Gallery, Invisible Atlas, New York, NY (2015)
 H Art Gallery, I Miss You Already, Bangkok, Thailand (2014)
 Epson Imaging Gallery, Chinese Sentiment, Shanghai, China (2012)
 Light Work, I Miss You Already, Syracuse, NY (2012)
 Daniel Cooney Fine Art, I Miss You Already, New York, NY (2012)
 L.A. Galerie Frankfurt, Chinese Sentiment, Frankfurt, Germany (2013)
 Lumenvisum Gallery, Chinese Sentiment, Hong Kong, China (2011)
 The Art Institute of Boston, Chinese Sentiment, Boston, MA (2011)
 Daniel Cooney Fine Art, Chinese Sentiment, New York, NY (2011)
 Randall Scott Gallery, Almost Naked, New York, NY (2009)

Group exhibitions
 Museum of Contemporary Photography, Go Down Moses, Chicago, IL (2019)
 Hasselblad Foundation, Moonlight – 50 Years of Photographing the Moon, Göteborg, Sweden (2019)
 Museo Fotografia Contemporanea, West East, Milan, Italy (2019)
 Harn Museum of Art, Inside Outside: Outside Inside, Gainesville, FL (2018)
 CAFA Art Museum, Beijing Photo Biennial, Beijing, China (2018)
 Museo Universitario del Chopo, Divina Comedia, Mexico City, Mexico (2018)
 The Ringling Museum of Art, Exposure: Naked before the lens, Sarasota, FL (2016)
 Power Station of Art, Snacks, Shanghai, China (2016)
 La Triennale di Milano, Arts & Foods. Rituals since 1851. Milan, Italy (2015)
 North Carolina Museum of Art, Private Eye: Allen G. Thomas Jr. Photography Collection, Raleigh, NC (2014)
 He Xiangning Art Museum, Local Future, Shenzhen, China (2013)
 Moscow Museum of Modern Art. Between Image and Personality. Moscow, Russia (2013)
 Museum of Fine Arts, St. Petersburg, Recent Acquisitions: Prints, Drawings, and Photographs, FL (2013)
 He Xiangning Art Museum, Local Future, Shenzhen, China (2013)
 Moscow Museum of Modern Art. Between Image and Personality. Moscow, Russia (2013)
 Daegu Biennale, Special Exhibition: Repositioned Personal, Daegu, Korea (2012)
 Liu Haisu Art Museum, Hong Kong and One World, Shanghai, China (2012)
 Southeast Museum of Photography, Anthology 2012: Contemporary Photography, Daytona Beach, FL (2012)
 Philadelphia Museum of Art, Philadelphia, PMA Photography Portfolio 2012, Philadelphia, PA (2012)
 Harn Museum of Art, Highlights from the Asian Collection, Gainesville, Florida  (2011)
 Museum of the City of New York, Movable Feast, New York, NY (2011)
 Galleria Contemporaneo, Global Photography, Venice, Italy. (2010)
 The Kinsey Institute Gallery, Nature & Nurture, Bloomington, IN (2010)
 CAFA Art Museum, Faces of Life, Beijing, China (2010)
 Deutsche Bank Gallery, Dare to Struggle, Dare to Win, New York, NY (2008)
 Australian Centre for Photography, Hijacked, Sydney, Australia. (2008)
 ZONE: Chelsea Center for the Arts, U Can't Touch Dis, New York, NY (2007)
 Lincoln Center Avery Fisher Hall, Obsession, New York, NY (2005)

References

External links 

 Flowers Gallery
 SinoVision Interview: Shen Wei - Invisible Atlas
 Asia Society ChinaFile: Shen Wei - A Homecoming
 Charles Lane Press
 Photo Eye Magazine | Chinese Sentiment
 Light Work | Shen Wei：I Miss You Already
 Jiazazhi Press | Shen Wei - Almost Naked

Artists from Shanghai
Chinese photographers
Chinese erotic photographers
1977 births
Living people